The Beldame Stakes is an American Thoroughbred horse race for fillies and mares three-years-old and up.  Inaugurated in 1939, it was run as a handicap prior to 1960. The race is held annually near the beginning of October at Belmont Park and currently offers a purse of $400,000.

A Grade I event for most of its history, in 2019 it was downgraded to Grade II.

On August 22, 2009, NYRA announced that the purse for the 2009 Beldame Stakes was increased to $1 million to attract a showdown between Rachel Alexandra and Zenyatta though ultimately neither horse entered the race.

The race is named for the U.S. Racing Hall of Fame mare Beldame who raced between 1903 and 1905. During the 1904 season, she won 12 of 14 starts, beating the best colts of her time, and was voted the Horse of the Year honors.

The first New York bred to win an Eclipse Award, Saratoga Dew, won this race in 1992.

Run at  miles since 1991, the Beldame has been set at various distances:
  miles : 1939, 1990
 1 mile & 1 furlong : 1940–1976
  miles : 1991–present
  miles : 1977–1989

Records
Speed record: (At current distance of  miles)
 1:45.80- Go for Wand (1990)

Most wins:
 2 – Fairy Chant (1940, 1941)
 2 – Next Move (1950, 1952)
 2 – Gamely (1968, 1969)
 2 – Susan's Girl (1972, 1975)
 2 – Desert Vixen (1973, 1974)
 2 – Love Sign (1980, 1981)
 2 – Lady's Secret (1985, 1986)
 2 – Personal Ensign (1987, 1988)
 2 – Sightseek (2003, 2004)

Most wins by a trainer:
 6 – Todd Pletcher (2013, 2010, 2007, 2006, 2005, 2022)

Most wins by a jockey:
 5 – Jorge Velásquez (1973, 1976, 1978, 1984, 1985)

Most wins by an owner:
 4 – Foxcatcher Farm (1940, 1941, 1954, 1960)
 4 – Ogden Phipps (1983, 1987, 1988, 1994)
 4 – Godolphin Racing (2002, 2008, 2009, 2015)

Winners

References

 The Beldame Stakes at Pedigree query
 The 2007 Beldame Stakes at the NTRA

Graded stakes races in the United States
Mile category horse races for fillies and mares
Grade 1 stakes races in the United States
Horse races in New York (state)
Recurring sporting events established in 1939
Belmont Park
Breeders' Cup Challenge series
1939 establishments in New York (state)